Leptosiphon oblanceolatus (syn. Linanthus oblanceolatus) is a species of flowering plant in the phlox family known by the common name Sierra Nevada linanthus.

Distribution
It is endemic to California, where it is known only from a section of the southern Sierra Nevada.

Description
Leptosiphon oblanceolatus is a small, hairy annual herb producing a thin stem no more than about 12 centimeters tall. The leaves are each divided into widely lance-shaped lobes up to 1.5 centimeters long.

The inflorescence is a head of small flowers. Each has a narrow white tube about a centimeter long and a yellow-throated white corolla just a few millimeters wide. The bloom period is from July to August.

External links
Calflora Database: Leptosiphon oblanceolatus (Sierra Nevada leptosiphon)
Jepson Manual eFlora (TJM2) treatment of Leptosiphon oblanceolatus

oblanceolatus
Endemic flora of California
Flora of the Sierra Nevada (United States)
Flora without expected TNC conservation status